The filmography of American actor Darren McGavin includes over 180 credits in both film and television. In addition to his screen career, McGavin was also a stage actor, and appeared in eight Broadway productions between 1954 and 1967.

Filmography

Film

Television

Stage credits

References

Male actor filmographies
American filmographies